J. J. Rudolf Handmann (1862–1940) was a Swiss pastor, professor, theologian and biblical scholar. He was a student of Adolf von Harnack. He was pastor of the :de:St. Jakobskirche (Basel), part of the Basel Münster congregation, from 1890 to his retirement on 5 May 1935.

Works
 Das Hebräer-Evangelium - Ein Beitrag zur Geschichte und Kritik des hebräischen Matthäus 1888

References

Swiss biblical scholars
1862 births
1940 deaths